Eduard Fresenius (November 17 1874, Frankfurt am Main – February 10, 1946, Bad Homburg) was a German entrepreneur and pharmacist.

In 1912, Eduard Fresenius founded German company Fresenius. Eduard Fresenius was married. Else Fernau, Eduard's foster daughter, and her husband Hans Kröner became leaders of the Fresenius company after the death of Eduard Fresenius.

See also 
Fresenius (company)
Else Kröner-Fresenius-Foundation

External links 
 Official website by Fresenius

References 

German pharmacists
German company founders
20th-century German businesspeople
Businesspeople from Frankfurt
1874 births
1946 deaths